Brigadier Rajinder Singh Jamwal, MVC (14 June 1899 – 26/27 October 1947), also remembered as the Saviour of Kashmir, was an officer in the Jammu and Kashmir State Forces. He briefly served as the Chief of Staff of State Forces and died fighting during the First Kashmir War. Rajinder Singh and his small contingent of about 200 men successfully delayed the advance of a much larger force of Pakistani tribal raiders near Uri for several days, during which the Maharaja of Kashmir acceded to India and the Indian forces air-lifted for the defence of Kashmir.

On 30 December 1949, he was posthumously awarded Maha Vir Chakra, independent India’s second highest military decoration. He was the first Indian to receive the honour.

Early life 
Rajinder Singh was born on 14 June 1899 in Bagoona village (now Rajinderpura, Samba district) in a military Dogra family. His ancestor General Baj Singh had died serving under Maharaja Gulab Singh. His grandfather Hamir Singh and father Subedar Lakha Singh were both war veterans. Rajinder Singh was brought up by an uncle, Lt. Colonel Govind Singh, since he was a small child. Singh passed out from Prince of Wales College (now GGM Science College) in Jammu in 1921.

Military career 
Rajinder Singh was commissioned on 14 June 1921, in to the Jammu and Kashmir State Forces as a Second Lieutenant. On 25 September 1947, he took over charge as Chief of Army Staff of the Jammu and Kashmir State Forces from Major General H. L. Scott.

Indo-Pakistani War of 1947–1948 
In September 1947, Pakistan started making preparations for raids into Kashmir, with the aim of capturing Srinagar. On the night of October 21/22, a large number of Pakistani regulars and tribal irregulars gathered near Muzzafarabad. They were successful in instigating the Muslim soldiers of the 4th J&K Battalion of Maharaja Hari Singh's army that was based in the town. The Muslim soldiers rebelled, killing Wazir-e-wazarat Duni Chand Mehta & Col.Narain Singh Sambyal in charge and all the other all Dogra soldiers at the base. This left the 180 km route to Srinagar unguarded, however instead of moving on towards Srinagar, the raiders from Pakistan raided Muzaffarabad. News of the raid only reached the Maharaja the next day. On 22 October 1947, Maharaja Hari Singh gave his Chief of Army Staff, Brigadier Rajinder Singh, the order to defend the state until Indian troops arrived, that he should fight till death in doing so, "save the state till the last man and the last bullet". Karan Singh was present in the room when Hari Singh gave Brigadier Rajinder Singh the command and remembers the incident, "Brigadier Rajinder Singh was given the order by my father and he just saluted and walked away."

With 150-260 men and officers from Badami Bagh cantonment and nearby establishments, equipped with out-dated weapons (though some accounts add that the Brigadier had two 3-inch mortars and MMGs), and using private vehicles, Brigadier Rajinder left Sringar at 6:30 pm and reached Uri at 2 am on 23 October 1947. Brigadier Rajinder Singh moved on with a small platoon, and after fighting raiders in Garhi, he soon realized that his force was greatly outnumbered against the raiders who also had superior weapons.

On 23 October, Hari Singh sent a command to Brigadier Rajinder Singh through Captain Jwala Singh, "Brigadier Rajinder Singh is commanded to hold the enemy at Uri at all costs and to the last man. Reinforcement is sent with Capt Jwala Singh...". On 24 October Captain Jwala Singh arrived with a small number of reinforcements, numbering less than 100 men. Brigadier Rajinder Singh ordered the destruction of bridges to slow down the raiders. However Rajinder Singh's men had to fall further back to Mahura for another defensive position, reaching Mahura at 10 pm. The defense at Mahura held when the enemy decided to resume the attack on the morning of 25 October. Rajinder Singh, also ordered men to blow up the bridges upstream but before the bridges could be destroyed, some raiders had already crossed over. Rajinder Singh once again ordered his men to fall back, moving them to Rampur, where defensive positions were created throughout the night. On the morning of the 26th the enemy launched another attack. The defence held effectively again, and the raiders movement was again halted. At dusk Brigadier Singh ordered a withdrawal towards Baramulla. At 1 am on 27 October the retreating vehicles were attacked at Diwan Mandir, Boniyar, and the convoy halted. The Brigadier's driver was soon killed so the Brigadier drove himself; however soon after he was also mortally wounded. The Brigadier ordered his men to continue ahead with the planned defensive strategy, and leave him where he was. Nothing more was heard of Brigadier Rajinder Singh. His men continued the fight until the next day, but nearly all were killed soon after. However the delay the Brigadier and his men caused the raiders, a delay of nearly 4 days, was enough for diplomatic decisions to be taken and for the Indian Army to arrive.

Maha Vir Chakra 
On 30 December 1949, for his act of gallantry in Jammu and Kashmir, Rajinder Singh was posthumously awarded India's first Maha Vir Chakra. His wife, Ram Dei, received the medal from Army Chief Field Marshall K.M. Cariappa. The citation reads:

Legacy 
For his valiant rearguard last-stand actions, Brigadier Rajinder Singh is remembered as the "Saviour of Kashmir". V.P. Menon, an Indian civil servant, had said of Brigadier Rajinder:

Brigadier Rajinder's native hometown of Bagoona has been renamed as Rajinderpura. A park in Bagoona, Samba and Canal head Jammu have been named after Singh, called the "Brigadier Rajinder Singh Memorial Park" and Jammu city has paid tribute by renaming shopping road/street "Rajinder Bazar" in his honor. Both Brigadier Rajinder's birthday, 14 June, and day of martyrdom, 26 October, are celebrated. Locals honour Rajinder Singh's birth anniversary every year in his hometown. On 26 October 2018, the Government of Jammu and Kashmir and the Indian Army paid tributes at 'Brigadier Rajinder Singh Chowk' in Jammu. University of Jammu has an auditorium named after the Brigadier, while two schools in Samba district are also named after the Brigadier.

Sainik Samachar reported that on 24 October 2018 a bust of Brigadier Rajindra Singh, presented by his family, was unveiled at the Badami Bagh Cantonment in Srinagar. Also at Badami Bagh Cantonment is the Rajindra Villa, now the Signal Regiment Officers' Mess. The entrance of the cantonment is also named after Rajinder Singh. Sainik Samachar also reported that the family visited Boniyar to pay homage at the Memorial where Brigadier Rajindra Singh died fighting. Over the years there have been calls to posthumously honour the Brigadier with India's highest gallantry award, the Param Vir Chakra. In 1999, at the Rajinder Singh Pura Memorial, George Fernandes, the then Minister of Defence, had said "I am in agreement [...] that he should have been given PVC".

Notes

References

Further reading 

 Shankar Prasad (2005). The Gallant Dogras: An Illustrated History of the Dogra Regiment. pp 94 – 97. Lancer Publishers with the Dogra Regimental Centre. 
  K. Brahma Singh (1990). History of Jammu and Kashmir Rifles, 1820-1956. pp 234 – 236. Lancer International. 
 Major K.C. Praval (1987) Indian Army After Independence. pp 23. Lancer Publishers LLC.

External links 

 Official Government of India website for gallantry awards (gallantryawards.gov.in) entry
 List of Maha Vir Chakra awardees on the official website of the Indian Army (SNO 1)

1899 births
1947 deaths
20th-century Indian military personnel
Recipients of the Maha Vir Chakra
People from Samba district
Jammu and Kashmir State Forces
People of the Indo-Pakistani War of 1947